Aurai Assembly constituency is an assembly constituency in Muzaffarpur district in the Indian state of Bihar.

Overview
As per Delimitation of Parliamentary and Assembly constituencies Order, 2008, No. 89 Aurai Assembly constituency is composed of the following: Aurai community development block; Belpakauna, Berai North, Changel, Hathauri, Jajuar (including East, West, and Middle panchayats), Katai, Khanguradih, Lakhanpur, Nagwara, Pahsaul, Bansghatta, Barri, Tehwara and Bandhapura gram panchayats of Katra CD Block.

Aurai Assembly constituency is part of No. 15 Muzaffarpur (Lok Sabha constituency).

Members of Legislative Assembly

Election results

2020

References

External links
 

Assembly constituencies of Bihar
Politics of Muzaffarpur district